Maugerville (MAJOR-ville) is a civil parish in Sunbury County, New Brunswick, Canada.

For governance purposes it is divided between the local service districts of Noonan and the parish of Maugerville (which further includes the special service area of Inner Maugerville), both of which are members of Regional Service Commission 11 (RSC11).

Origin of name
The parish was named in honour of Joshua Mauger, Nova Scotia's agent in England and first name on the list of grantees in the township.

History
Maugerville was first established in 1765 as a township of Nova Scotia. The boundaries were significantly different, including part of Sheffield Parish but not extending as far inland.

Maugerville was erected in 1786 as one of Sunbury County's original parishes.

In 1850 Maugerville was extended to the county line, adding unassigned land to its rear.

Boundaries
Maugerville Parish is bounded:

 on the northeast by the Northumberland County line;
 on the southeast by a line beginning about on the county line about 2.6 kilometres northwesterly of Cains River, then following the prolongation of the southeastern line of a grant to Nathaniel Underhill and D. Palmer Jr. on the Saint John River, about 225 metres upstream of the foot of Middle Island, then following the prolongation southwesterly to the Saint John;
 on the southwest by the Saint John River;
 on the northwest by the York County line;
 including Oromocto Island in the Saint John River.

Communities
Communities at least partly within the parish. italics indicate a name no longer in official use
 Lower St. Marys
 Maugerville
  Noonan (Rear Maugerville)
 Sunbury
 Upper Maugerville

Bodies of water
Bodies of water at least partly within the parish.

 Cains River
 Gaspereau River
 Little River
  Saint John River
 Bartlett Millstream
 Burpee Millstream
 Burpee Deadwater
 Little Portobello Stream
 Noonan Stream
 Portobello Stream
 Estey Creek
 Mud Creek
 Newcastle Creek
 Brook Styx
 more than ten officially named lakes

Islands
Islands at least partly within the parish.
 Bear Island
 Long Island
 Oromocto Island

Other notable places
Parks, historic sites, and other noteworthy places at least partly within the parish.
 Acadia Forestry Station
 Bantalor Wildlife Management Area
 Bull Pasture Bog Protected Natural Area
 Burpee Wildlife Management Area
 Burpee Lake Protected Natural Area
 Gaspereau Protected Natural Area
 Grand Lake Protected Natural Area
 Little Forks Brook Protected Natural Area
 Little River Protected Natural Area
 Portobello Creek National Wildlife Area

Demographics

Population
Population trend

Language
Mother tongue (2016)

See also
List of parishes in New Brunswick

Notes

References

Parishes of Sunbury County, New Brunswick
Local service districts of Sunbury County, New Brunswick